The Chippiparai is a breed of sighthound from the State of Tamil Nadu in southern India.

The Chippiparai has typical streamlined sighthound features with long legs and a lean and lithe frame built for speed. The breed is usually white in colour, although other colours can be found. It averages  in height at the withers, dogs averaging  and bitches . A hardy breed, the Chippiparai is reputed to prefer a single master, shunning food and pats from anyone except its handler. The Chippiparai is often regarded as the most intelligent and biddable of India's native dog breeds.

The Chippiparai is most frequently found in the regions of Virudhunagar, Tirunelveli, Thenkasi, Thoothukudi, and Madurai, thought to be descended from Salukis the breed was historically kept by royalty in southern India, its name derived from a village name of Sippipparai in Vembakottai Taluk of Virudhunagar District. The Chippiparai was traditionally used to hunt small game, predominantly hare. Due to its intelligence and biddable nature, the breed has successfully been trained as police dogs.

See also
 Dogs portal
 List of dog breeds
 List of dog breeds from India
 Chippiparai Dog History and Insight

References

Dog breeds originating in India
Sighthounds
Breeds originating from Indigenous people